"All I See" is a song by American R&B artist Christopher Williams recorded for his second album Changes (1992). The song was released as the second single for the album. Also in 2021, singer Bryson Tiller sampled the song for him song "Still Yours", which featured rapper Big Sean in the third studio album Anniversary.

Track listings
12", Vinyl
"All I See" (Radio) - 4:15
"All I See" (Instrumental) - 4:41
"All I See" (Album) - 4:43

Personnel
Information taken from Discogs.
production: DeVante Swing
writing: DeVante Swing, Andre Harrell, Christopher Williams

Charts

Weekly charts

Year-end charts

Notes

External links

1992 singles
Christopher Williams (singer) songs
Song recordings produced by DeVante Swing
1992 songs
Songs written by DeVante Swing
Uptown Records singles
Songs written by Christopher Williams (singer)